"Ice Cream for Crow" is a song by Captain Beefheart and The Magic Band as the title track from their final album, 1982's Ice Cream for Crow. It was released in 1982 as the sole single for the album.

Music video 
The line-up of the band at the time made a music video, filmed on 7 August 1982 to promote the title track, which was directed by Van Vliet and Ken Schreiber, with cinematography by Daniel Pearl. It was rejected by MTV for being "too weird" on submission. However, the video was shown on a Letterman broadcast on NBC-TV to applause, and was also accepted into the Museum of Modern Art. Van Vliet announced "I don't want my MTV if they don't want my video" during his interview with Letterman, in reference to MTV's "I want my MTV" marketing campaign of the time. The video was shot on location in the Mojave Desert, California, near where Beefheart lived with his wife.

Track listing

References

Captain Beefheart songs
Songs written by Captain Beefheart
1982 songs
Epic Records singles